Swionibacillus  is a Gram-negative, strictly aerobic and non-motile genus of bacteria from the family of Bacillaceae with one known species (Swionibacillus sediminis). Swionibacillus sediminis has been isolated from marine sediments from the south-west Indian Ocean.

References

Bacillaceae
Bacteria genera
Monotypic bacteria genera
Taxa described in 2017